Tephritis rydeni is a species of tephritid or fruit flies in the genus Tephritis of the family Tephritidae.

Distribution
Sweden, North & Central Russia.

References

Tephritinae
Insects described in 1956
Diptera of Europe